Gadad Andhar is a 2023 Indian Marathi-language supernatural thriller film directed by Pradnyesh Ramesh Kadam and produced by Elula Entertainment. It is a first Marathi underwater supernatural fiction film. The film was scheduled to be theatrically released on 3 February 2023.

Cast 

 Neha Mahajan
 Jay Dudhane
 Shubhangi Tambale
 Akash Kumbhar
 Aarti shinde
 Chetan Mule
 Astha Thombare

Release and marketing 
The teaser of the film was uploaded on 20 December 2022 and trailer was on 17 January 2023 by Rajshree productions and Zee Music Company on YouTube. It is scheduled to be theatrically released on 3 February 2023.

Soundtrack 

Music is composed by Rohit Shyam Raut and background score is by Adinath Patkar.

References

External links 

 

2023 films
2023 thriller films
Upcoming Indian films